In the run up to the 2016 Russian legislative election, various organisations carried out opinion polling to gauge voting intention in Russia. Results of such polls are displayed in this article.

The date range for these opinion polls are from the previous legislative election, held on 4 December 2011, to 11 September 2016.

Graphical summary

Party vote
Poll results are listed in the table below in reverse chronological order, showing the most recent first, and using the date the survey's fieldwork was done, as opposed to the date of publication. If that date is unknown, the date of publication is given instead. The highest percentage figure in each polling survey is displayed in bold, and the background shaded in the leading party's colour. If a tie occurs, then no figure is shaded. The lead column on the right shows the percentage-point difference between the two parties with the highest figures. When a specific poll does not show a data figure for a party, the party's cell corresponding to that poll is shown empty.

The table below represents mostly 2016 polls of Russian citizens (including voters who are undecided about which party they would vote for or are not sure whether they will actually vote, those saying they will not be voting, voters who have decided to spoil their ballots, supporters of any other party that is not on the list). Parties with more than 5% support (enough to enter State Duma) are given in bold. Throughout the campaign political analysts have predicted that only three or four parties will be elected to the Duma - UR, CPRF, LDPR, and JR.

Notes

References

Opinion polling
Legislative 2016
Russia